Safargulovo (Säfärğol) is a rural locality (a village) in Inzersky Selsoviet, Beloretsky District, Bashkortostan, Russia. The population was 99 as of 2010. There are 2 streets.

Geography 
Safargulovo is located 93 km northwest of Beloretsk (the district's administrative centre) by road. Novokasanovo is the nearest rural locality.

References 

Rural localities in Beloretsky District